The Charmbracelet World Tour was the fifth worldwide concert tour in 2003–2004 by American singer-songwriter Mariah Carey in support of her ninth studio album Charmbracelet (2002). The tour started on June 20, 2003 in Seoul, South Korea, and visited several countries in Asia, Europe, and North America  before ending on February 26, 2004 in Dubai. At the end of 2003, the tour placed 83rd on Pollstar's "Top 100 Tours", grossing more than $6.0 million with 25 shows from her first North American leg.

Background 

In April 2003, Carey announced a world tour in support of her recent studio album Charmbracelet. The tour followed her Rainbow World Tour in 2000 and was her most extensive lasting for sixty-nine shows over eight months. The tour reached many places in East Asia, Southeast Asia, and the Middle East.

Since her debut on the music scene in 1990, Carey has toured very infrequently compared to many other established acts. As such, the length of this tour had actually been extended due to Carey attempting to promote the Charmbracelet album which was underperforming. After the initial stretch of the tour, Carey decided to add additional dates. For the new dates, she performed a more condensed show, removing several songs from the set list and performing a few new songs in their place with Christmas elements during the seasonal period.

In the United States, venues were switched from large arenas to smaller, more intimate theatre shows due to slow sales in some cities. According to Carey, however, the change was made in order to give fans a more intimate show. She said, "It's much more intimate so you'll feel like you had an experience. You experience a night with me." However, while smaller venues were booked for the US leg of the tour, Carey performed at some arenas in Asia and Europe. In the UK, it was Carey's first tour to feature shows outside London; she performed in Glasgow, Birmingham and Manchester.

Critical response 
The tour garnered praise from music critics and audiences, many of whom complimented the quality of Carey's live vocals and the production of the shows. Fans were given the opportunity to request songs from Carey's catalog, which added to its positive reception. At her concert in Manila, Rito P. Asilo from Philippine Daily Inquirer wrote, "I didn't expect her voice to be that crystal clear!" He added, "After 15 songs, we couldn't seem to get enough of Mariahand we became a believer!".

Carey's sexual image also generated some controversy during the tour. In various countries, she was often criticized for her choice of dress, and a Pan-Islamic youth leader attempted to have her banned from performing in Malaysia.

Set list 

 "Looking In" (Instrumental introduction) contains elements of "Butterfly")
 "Heartbreaker" (contains elements of "Desert Storm Remix")
 "Dreamlover"
 "Through the Rain"
 "My All" 
 "Marionette Show" 
 "Clown"
 "Honey" (contains elements of "Bad Boy Remix")
 "I Know What You Want"
 "Subtle Invitation"
 "My Saving Grace"
 "I'll Be There" (with Trey Lorenz)
 "Friend of Mine" (Interlude) (performed by Trey Lorenz)
 "Bringin' On the Heartbreak"
 "Fantasy" (Bad Boy Remix)
 "Always Be My Baby"
 "Make It Happen"
 "Vision of Love"
 "Hero"
 "Butterfly Reprise" (Outro)

Shows

Personnel 
Randy Jackson – musical director
Lionel Cole - piano, keyboards
Eric Daniels – keyboards
Sam Sims - bass
Vernon Black – guitar
Gregory "Gigi" Gonoway – drums
Trey Lorenz – background vocals
Mary Ann Tatum – background vocals
Sherry Tatum - background vocals
Takeytha Johnson – background vocals

References 

Mariah Carey concert tours
2003 concert tours
2004 concert tours